Suprunenko Viacheslav Ivanovich is major shareholder of ASVIO BANK, owner of asset management company ASVIO and president of law firm "Pravozahisnyk".

Biography

He was born on September 17, 1976, in Kyiv.

In 2003 he graduated from Kyiv National University. T. Shevchenko, specialization: "The constitutional and financial law". He has a PhD in law.

Founded and headed the law firm "Pravozahisnyk" (Kyiv), which specializes in representing the interests of the community and upholding human rights.

Social activity

2002-2006 - deputy of the Kyiv City Council of  IV convocation
2006-2008 - deputy of the Kyiv City Council of the V convocation
2008-2011 - deputy of the Kyiv City Council of the VI convocation

member of the committee on the budget and the socio-economic development

He is not a member of any political party.

Business

Viacheslav Suprunenko owns 61% in Asvio Bank. 

He is co-founder in asset management company ASVIO

Family

His father is Ivan Suprunenko, born in 1946, a manager on the railroad in Kyiv and his mother was Nadezhda Suprunenko who worked in the trust "Yugozapadtransstroy" (Kyiv), died in 2001.

Divorced. He has three children: daughter Alina (2000 year of birth), son Leonid (2002), son Ivan (2007).

His brother is Alexander Suprunenko, he was member of parliament (2014 year of election, self-promotion).  

Alexander Suprunenko informed that he refuses to continue political activity and plans to focus on implementation of social and charitable projects as well as creation of independent media.

References 
 Who is Who in Ukraine
 Official site of the Kyiv city council
 List of deputies of 4th convocation's
 List of deputies of 5th convocation's
 Site of Suprunenko Vyacheslav
 Analysts challenge the existence of political future for the “line-crossers” from Chernovetsky Bloc fraction

1976 births
Ukrainian politicians
Living people